Grčac  is a village in the municipality of Smederevska Palanka, Serbia. According to the 2002 census, the village has a population of 1176 people.

In the village is the Neolithic and Eneolithic archaeologic site of Medvednjak.

References

Populated places in Podunavlje District